The 7th Squadron was a squadron of the 4th Air Wing of the Japan Air Self-Defense Force based at Matsushima Air Base, in Iwate Prefecture, Japan. It was equipped with North American F-86F Sabre aircraft.

History
On February 1, 1960, the squadron was formed at Matsushima Air Base in Iwate Prefecture as part of the 5th Air Wing. On July 1, 1960, it transferred to the 4th Air Wing. It was a frontline squadron until the 4th Air Wing became responsible for training on August 23, 1973.

It was disbanded on June 30, 1970. Squadrons 1-11 were F-86F squadrons.

Aircraft operated

Fighter aircraft
 North American F-86F Sabre（1960-1977）

See also
 Fighter units of the Japan Air Self-Defense Force

References

Units of the Japan Air Self-Defense Force